Cyphotheca is a genus of flowering plants belonging to the family Melastomataceae.

Its native range is Southern Central China.

Species:
 Cyphotheca montana Diels

References

Melastomataceae
Melastomataceae genera